A helix is a spiral-like space curve.

Helix may also refer to:

Helix (mythology)

Arts, entertainment, and media
 Helix (roller coaster), a roller coaster at Liseberg in Gothenburg, Sweden

Print
 The Helix (magazine), an Australian teen science bimonthly
 Helix (newspaper), a 1960s Seattle underground newspaper
 Helix (comics), a 1996-1998 DC comics imprint
 Helix (Marvel Comics), a superhero
 Helix SF, an online magazine
 Helix, a 2007 novel by Eric Brown
 Helix, a team of super-villains in the comics series Infinity Inc.

Film, television, and video games
 Helix (film) or Innocent, a 2009 American film directed by Aram Rappaport
 Helix (TV series), an American science fiction series 2014–2015
 Helix (video game), a music video game
 Helix, a character in the 2017 video game Arms

Music
 Helix (band), a Canadian hard rock band
 Helix (Amaranthe album), 2018
 Helix (Crystal Lake album)
 Helix (composition), a 2005 orchestral piece by Esa-Pekka Salonen
 "Helix", a song by DJ Flume from Skin
 "Helix", a song by Justice from Audio, Video, Disco

Biology
 Helix (ear), the prominent rim of the auricle
 Helix (gastropod), a genus of snails

Computing
 Helix (cipher) published in 2003
 Helix (database), database management system for the Apple Macintosh platform, created in 1983
 Helix (multimedia project), a project to produce computer software that can play audio and video media in various formats, aid in producing such media, and serve them over a network
 Helix, a market payment service with an integrated bitcoin tumbler by the darknet-market search engine Grams.
Helix ALM, formerly called TestTrack, software for managing requirements, defects, issues and testing throughout the software development cycle developed by Seapine Software

Enterprises
 Helix (genomics company), a U.S.-based population genomics company
 Helix (stationery company), a UK scholastic stationery manufacturer
 Helix Energy Solutions Group
 Helix Software Company, a former US-based system and utility software company founded in 1986
 Helix High School, La Mesa, California, a charter high school 
 The Helix (Falkirk), a regeneration project in Scotland

Locations
 The Helix Bridge, officially The Helix, a pedestrian bridge linking Marina Centre with Marina South in the Marina Bay area in Singapore
 New Jersey Route 495 or The Helix, a roadway approaching the Lincoln Tunnel
See also Spiral bridge
 The Helix, Dublin, a concert hall and performance space on the Dublin City University
Helix Nebula, a large planetary nebula (PN) located in the constellation Aquarius in outer space

Transportation
 Honda Helix, a scooter
 Kamov Ka-27, a helicopter, NATO reporting name Helix

See also
 Spiral (disambiguation)